Dion Nelin (born 28 August 1976) is a Danish carom billiards player. He won twice at the Three-Cushion World Cup from 1996 to 1997. Nelin got into second place three times and third place five times at the Three-Cushion World Cup from 1995 to 2000. He placed second place at the UMB World Three-cushion Championship in 2002. Nelin was preferred as a best ranked player in Danish, according to the cited Kozoom article. Dan Johansen had helped out Nelin. He spend his summer with a working job, in which Nelin was participant of the Danish Championship.

References

External links 

1976 births
Living people
Place of birth missing (living people)
Carom billiards players
Three-cushion billiards players
World champions in three-cushion billiards
World Cup champions in three-cushion billiards